Scytosiphonaceae is a family of brown algae in the order Ectocarpales.

Genera:

References

Ectocarpales
Brown algae families